Michael Lawrence Dyer (born September 8, 1966), is a retired Major League Baseball pitcher.

External links

Retrosheet
Pura Pelota Venezuelan Professional Baseball League statistics

1966 births
Living people
American expatriate baseball players in Canada
Baseball players from California
Buffalo Bisons (minor league) players
Canton-Akron Indians players
Caribes de Oriente players
American expatriate baseball players in Venezuela
Elizabethton Twins players
Iowa Cubs players
Kenosha Twins players
Lehigh Valley Black Diamonds players
Major League Baseball pitchers
Minnesota Twins players
Montreal Expos players
Orlando Twins players
People from Upland, California
Pittsburgh Pirates players
Portland Beavers players
Richmond Braves players
Citrus Owls baseball players